Bezvodnaya (Psynĉə) is a rural locality (a stanitsa) in Krasnooktyabrskoye Rural Settlement of Maykopsky District, Russia. The population was 67 as of 2018. There are 7 streets.

Geography 
The stanitsa is located on the Bezvodnaya River, 42 km southwest of Tulsky (the district's administrative centre) by road. Krasny Dagestan is the nearest rural locality.

Ethnicity 
The stanitsa is inhabited by Russians.

References 

Rural localities in Maykopsky District